Rudolf Hägler (born 24 January 1925) was a Swiss footballer who played as a forward. 

Hägler joined FC Basel's first team in their 1947–48 season under player-manager Hufschmid. After just one test match, Hägler played his domestic league debut for the club in the away game on 16 November 1947 as Basel played a 3–3 draw against Zürich.

He scored his first goal for his club on 27 December 1947 during the home game at the Landhof against Locarno in the Swiss Cup. It was Basel's fifth goal as Basel won 5–3.

In his two seasons with the team, Hägler played twelve games for Basel and scored twice. Five games were in the Nationalliga A, two in the Swiss Cup and five were friendlies. He scored once in the cup and once in a friendly.

Following his time with FC Basel, Hägler moved on to FC Nordstern Basel where he played for at least three seasons.

References

Sources
 Rotblau: Jahrbuch Saison 2017/2018. Publisher: FC Basel Marketing AG. 
 Die ersten 125 Jahre. Publisher: Josef Zindel im Friedrich Reinhardt Verlag, Basel. 
 Verein "Basler Fussballarchiv" Homepage

FC Basel players
FC Nordstern Basel players
Swiss men's footballers
Association football forwards
1925 births
Possibly living people